The Second Optional Protocol to the International Covenant on Civil and Political Rights, aiming at the abolition of the death penalty, is a subsidiary agreement to the International Covenant on Civil and Political Rights. It was created on 15 December 1989 and entered into force on 11 July 1991. As of April 2022, the Optional Protocol has 90 state parties. The most recent country to ratify was Kazakhstan, on 24 March 2022.

The Optional Protocol commits its members to the abolition of the death penalty within their borders, though Article 2.1 allows parties to make a reservation allowing execution "in time of war pursuant to a conviction for a most serious crime of a military nature committed during wartime" (Brazil, Chile, El Salvador). Cyprus, Malta and Spain initially made such reservations, and subsequently withdrew them. Azerbaijan and Greece still retain this reservation on their implementation of the protocol, despite both having banned the death penalty in all circumstances. (Greece has also ratified Protocol no.13 of the European Convention on Human Rights, which abolishes capital punishment for all crimes).

See also
 First Optional Protocol to the International Covenant on Civil and Political Rights
 Use of capital punishment by nation
 List of most recent executions by jurisdiction

References

External links
 Text of the Protocol
 List of parties

Human rights instruments
United Nations treaties
Second Optional Protocol to the International Covenant on Civil and Political Rights
Anti–death penalty treaties
Second Optional Protocol to the International Covenant on Civil and Political Rights
Second Optional Protocol to the International Covenant on Civil and Political Rights
Treaties of Albania
Treaties of Andorra
Treaties of Argentina
Treaties of Australia
Treaties of Austria
Treaties of Azerbaijan
Treaties of Belgium
Treaties of Benin
Treaties of Bolivia
Treaties of Bosnia and Herzegovina
Treaties of Brazil
Treaties of Bulgaria
Treaties of Canada
Treaties of Cape Verde
Treaties of Chile
Treaties of Colombia
Treaties of Costa Rica
Treaties of Croatia
Treaties of Cyprus
Treaties of the Czech Republic
Treaties of Denmark
Treaties of Djibouti
Treaties of the Dominican Republic
Treaties of Ecuador
Treaties of El Salvador
Treaties of Estonia
Treaties of Finland
Treaties of France
Treaties of Gabon
Treaties of the Gambia
Treaties of Georgia (country)
Treaties of East Germany
Treaties of West Germany
Treaties of Greece
Treaties of Guinea-Bissau
Treaties of Honduras
Treaties of Hungary
Treaties of Iceland
Treaties of Ireland
Treaties of Italy
Treaties of Kyrgyzstan
Treaties of Latvia
Treaties of Liberia
Treaties of Liechtenstein
Treaties of Lithuania
Treaties of Luxembourg
Treaties of Malta
Treaties of Mexico
Treaties of Monaco
Treaties of Mongolia
Treaties of Montenegro
Treaties of Mozambique
Treaties of Namibia
Treaties of Nepal
Treaties of the Netherlands
Treaties of New Zealand
Treaties of Nicaragua
Treaties of Norway
Treaties of Panama
Treaties of Paraguay
Treaties of the Philippines
Treaties of Poland
Treaties of Portugal
Treaties of Moldova
Treaties of Romania
Treaties of Rwanda
Treaties of San Marino
Treaties of Serbia and Montenegro
Treaties of Seychelles
Treaties of Slovakia
Treaties of Slovenia
Treaties of South Africa
Treaties of Spain
Treaties of Sweden
Treaties of Switzerland
Treaties of North Macedonia
Treaties of East Timor
Treaties of Togo
Treaties of Turkey
Treaties of Turkmenistan
Treaties of Ukraine
Treaties of the United Kingdom
Treaties of Uruguay
Treaties of Uzbekistan
Treaties of Venezuela
1989 politics in New York (state)
Treaties adopted by United Nations General Assembly resolutions
Treaties extended to the Netherlands Antilles
Treaties extended to Aruba
Treaties extended to the Faroe Islands
Treaties extended to Greenland